The Internationalist Workers Party (Parti ouvrier internationaliste, POI) was a French Trotskyist party established in 1936 after the exclusion of militant Trotskyists from the French Section of the Workers' International in 1935 and dissolved in 1939 when most of the militants had rejoined the Workers and Peasants' Socialist Party. It was an official section of the Fourth International.

References
Frédéric Charpier, Histoire de l'extrême-gauche trotskiste de 1929 à nos jours.

1936 establishments in France
1939 disestablishments in France
Communist parties in France
Defunct political parties in France
French Section of the Workers' International
Political parties disestablished in 1939
Political parties established in 1936
Trotskyist organizations in France